Two Men and Two Women Amongst Them (Spanish: Dos hombres y, en medio, dos mujeres) is a 1977 Spanish drama film directed by Rafael Gil and starring Nadiuska, Alberto Closas and Gemma Cuervo.

Cast
Nadiuska as María
Alberto Closas as Martín
Gemma Cuervo as Carmen
Alfredo Alba as Ramón
Mary Begoña

Juan Santamaría
Eva Robin
José Luis Barceló
Herminia Tejela
Anastasio de la Fuente

References

External links

La serie la puedes ver en repelis
Encuentra ver en repelis

1977 drama films
Spanish drama films
Films directed by Rafael Gil
1970s Spanish-language films
1970s Spanish films